R. B. (Barry) Naimark (July 1, 1932 – December 3, 2004) was a Canadian curler. He played as lead on the Lyall Dagg rink that won the 1964 Brier and World Championship. He also played in the 1959 Macdonald Brier as the skip of the British Columbia team (which included newspaper columnist Dick Beddoes at lead), finishing fourth. He died of cancer in 2004.

Personal life
In addition to curling, Naimark was also a race horse owner. Naimark learned to curl in Leader, Saskatchewan. He lived in Calgary before moving to Vancouver. He also played ice hockey, baseball, trapshooting, and table tennis.

References

1932 births
2004 deaths
Brier champions
World curling champions
Curlers from Regina, Saskatchewan
People from the Sunshine Coast Regional District
Curlers from Vancouver
Jewish Canadian sportspeople
Canadian male curlers
Canadian racehorse owners and breeders
Curlers from Calgary